Chaetodera regalis, common name the royal tiger beetle (which may also refer to Lophyra clathrata),  is a species of tiger beetle found in Sub-Saharan Africa, especially in the south-east. It is found in riverine habitats.

References

External links 

Beetles described in 1831
Beetles of Africa
Cicindelidae